East Bay FC Stompers is an American soccer club currently playing in the National Premier Soccer League. Founded in 2012 in San Francisco as San Francisco Stompers Football Club, since the 2016 season it has been based in Hayward, California. The team competed in the West Region – Golden Gate Conference, from 2012 to 2019, when they stopped active competition.

Year-by-year

Stadiums

Terra Nova High School Stadium (Pacifica, CA)  
Kezar Stadium (San Francisco, CA)  
Boxer Stadium (San Francisco, CA)  
Lowell High School Stadium (San Francisco, CA)  
Pioneer Stadium (Hayward, CA)

Coaches
Martin Sierra, head coach
William Forte, general manager 
David Mahabali, manager
Alex Ortega, assistant
Lewis Saxelby, assistant

References

External links

National Premier Soccer League teams
Association football clubs established in 2012
2012 establishments in California
Soccer clubs in the San Francisco Bay Area